Angelo Madsen Minax (born 1983) is an American filmmaker and interdisciplinary artist.

Life and career 
Angelo Madsen Minax was born in Petoskey, Michigan in the US in 1983. He studied art at the School of the Art Institute of Chicago and at Northwestern University and is an associate professor of time-based media at the University of Vermont. Minax works in documentary, fiction and hybrid film forms, sound and music performances, text and media installations.  Minax's films deal with themes of love and death, and punk, queer, rural, and activist cultures.  North by Current, an auto-ethnographic film about death, grief, and trans identity features home movies from the 1960s - 1980s as well as footage shot by Minax between 2016 and 2020. The experimental documentary is narrated both by Minax and The Child, a character who can be interpreted as Minax's dead niece, his younger self, or a more distant observer. North by Current premiered internationally at the 2021 Berlinale, in the U.S. at the 2021 Tribeca Film Festival, and has screened nationally and internationally.  Minax has also presented films at the European Media Art Festival, the Anthology Film Archives in New York and at numerous other film festivals.  His work has been on view at the Museum of Contemporary Art Chicago, the Leslie Lohman Museum, and the Museum of Fine Arts Houston.  Minax is Associate Professor of Time-Based Media at the University of Vermont. In 2022 he was awarded a Guggenheim Fellowship in Film-Video. In 2023 he was named a United States Artists (USA) fellow.

Filmography 
 Bigger on the Inside (2022)
 North By Current (2021)
 Two Sons and a River of Blood (2021) (with Amber Bemak)
 At the River (2020)
 The Eddies (2018)
 Kairos Dirt & the Errant Vacuum (2017)
 The Source is a Hole (2017)
 Separation of the Earth (By Fire)
 My Most Handsome Monster (2014)
 The Year I Broke My Voice (2012)
 Riot Acts: Flaunting Gender Deviance in Music Performance (2010)

References 

1983 births
American film directors
Living people
LGBT film directors
People from Petoskey, Michigan
School of the Art Institute of Chicago alumni
Northwestern University alumni
University of Vermont faculty
Transgender academics